The 2017 Arab Athletics Championships was the twentieth edition of the international athletics competition between Arab countries that took place from 15–18 July 2017 at Rades Athletic Stadium in Radès, close to Tunis, the capital of Tunisia. Around 400 athletes from 18 nations attended the event.

A series of grand prix track and field meetings were organised by the Arab Athletics Federation in order to promote qualification for the 2017 World Athletic Championships.

Medal summary

Men

Women

Medal table
Key

References

Results. Africathle. Retrieved on 2017-08-16.

Arab Athletics Championships
International athletics competitions hosted by Tunisia
Arab Athletics Championships
Arab Athletics Championships
Sports competitions in Radès
International sports competitions hosted by Tunisia
July 2017 sports events in Africa
21st century in Radès